Raphaël Chaume is a French professional rugby union player. He plays at prop for Clermont in the Top 14.

References

External links
Ligue Nationale De Rugby Profile
European Professional Club Rugby Profile
Clermont Profile

Living people
ASM Clermont Auvergne players
French rugby union players
1989 births
France international rugby union players
Rugby union props